Hingalganj Mahavidyalaya,  established in 2005, is a general degree college in Hingalganj. It offers undergraduate courses in arts.  It is affiliated to West Bengal State University.

Departments

Arts

Bengali (Hons)
English (Hons)
Education (Hons)
Sanskrit (Hons)
History (Hons)
Geography (Hons)
Political Science (Hons)
Philosophy
Sociology
Physical Education
Economics

See also
Education in India
List of colleges in West Bengal
Education in West Bengal

References

External links
 

Universities and colleges in North 24 Parganas district
Colleges affiliated to West Bengal State University
Educational institutions established in 2005
2005 establishments in West Bengal